John Alexander Lambie (18 December 1868 – 25 December 1923) was a Scottish footballer who played as a forward in the 1880s and 1890s. He still holds the records as the youngest Scotland player and captain of all time.

Career
Lambie was a regular in the Queens Park first team by the age of 16, and quickly won the Scottish Cup in 1886. He had been due to make his international debut for Scotland in a game against Ireland on 20 March 1886 aged 17 but had to withdraw at short notice, and due to his replacement James Kelly scoring (on his own debut) this has been recorded erroneously as among the youngest feats of international goalscoring. However, Lambie was still barely 18 when he did play against the same opposition on 19 February 1887 in a 4–1 win for Scotland and was appointed captain for the occasion, setting national records which both still stand (the youngest goalscorer Willie Groves set the mark a year later). In an era when international fixtures were far less common than modern times and with differing selection conventions, Lambie's second and final cap was against England on 17 March 1888; Scotland lost 5–0.

His international career was effectively ended when he moved to London for business reasons in May 1888, where he appeared for London Caledonians, the Corinthians, Swifts and the city's representative side. He made a guest appearance for Queen's Park under a pseudonym in the 1892 Scottish Cup Final, then featured more regularly for the Spiders in the 1893–94 season before returning to England.

Personal life
His younger brother William was also a noted footballer with Queen's Park and Scotland (he too won the Scottish Cup and made his international debut while a teenager); A third brother, Robert, also featured for Queen's Park; the three siblings' careers barely overlapped in terms of playing together.

See also
List of Scotland national football team captains
List of Scottish football families

References

External links

1868 births
1923 deaths
Scottish footballers
Footballers from Glasgow
Scotland international footballers
Association football forwards
Queen's Park F.C. players
London Caledonians F.C. players
Corinthian F.C. players
Swifts F.C. players